This is a list of the military equipment of South Africa, including the Army, Air force, Navy and Special forces.

Army 

Divided into 6 sections: Small arms and infantry weapons, Armoured vehicles, Artillery, Anti-aircraft, Miscellaneous, Logistic and utility vehicles.

Small arms and infantry weapons

Armoured vehicles

Artillery

Anti-aircraft

Miscellaneous

Logistic and utility vehicles

Navy 

Divided into 5 sections: Frigates, Submarines, Patrol boats and Auxiliary vessels

Frigates

Submarines

Patrol boats and minesweepers

Auxiliary vessels

Landing craft

Air force 

Divided into 6 sections: Combat aircraft, Transport, Unmanned aerial vehicles, Helicopters, Previous notable aircraft and Weapon systems

Combat aircraft

Transport

Unmanned aerial vehicles

Helicopters

Previous notable aircraft

Weapon systems

Special forces

Small arms and infantry weapons

See also 

 South African National Defence Force
 Military history of South Africa
 List of equipment of the South African Army
 List of South African military bases

References 

Lists of military equipment
Military equipment of South Africa
Military equipment of Africa by country
Military equipment by country